Mangad is a village in Kasaragod district in the state of Kerala, India.There are others places called Mangad in Thrissur, Kannur and Kollam.

References

Villages in Thrissur district